John Victor Nash (born 14 June 1891, date of death unknown) was an Argentine bobsledder. He competed in the four-man event at the 1928 Winter Olympics.

References

1891 births
Year of death missing
Argentine male bobsledders
Olympic bobsledders of Argentina
Bobsledders at the 1928 Winter Olympics
Sportspeople from Santa Fe Province